Games Done Quick (GDQ) is a semiannual video game speedrun charity marathon held in the United States, originally organized by the Speed Demos Archive and SpeedRunsLive communities. Since 2015, it has been handled by Games Done Quick, LLC. Held since 2010, the events have raised money for several charities.

The two flagship events held by Games Done Quick are Awesome Games Done Quick (AGDQ), held in early January every year, which raises money for the Prevent Cancer Foundation, and Summer Games Done Quick (SGDQ), usually held in late June or early July every year, which raises money for Doctors Without Borders. Both events last for seven days. In addition to these events, GDQ hosts several other broadcasts throughout the year, including smaller marathons supporting different charities, one-off events for special occasions, and regular GDQ Hotfix programming throughout the year.

The events are broadcast live on Twitch. Viewers are encouraged to donate for incentives during the stream such as selecting the file name or main character's name in a run, having the runners attempt more difficult challenges, and entering raffles for the chance of winning prizes. As of February 2023, $43.8 million has been raised across 41 marathons. This includes precisely 800,358 separate donations from 257,754 unique donors.

Format 

Speedrunners take turns demonstrating their prowess at beating various video games in the quickest possible time, done in front of an audience as well as a livestream through Twitch. Sometimes these runs may be executed in an unusual or specific way, such as fully completing every level, completing a game blindfolded, or featuring multiple runners racing against one another to complete a game first. Video games run in Games Done Quick events include both retro and modern titles. The runs typically feature commentary from the runner(s) or experienced commentators, as well as donation messages read by an announcer.

Most of the popular runs feature video game glitches and discussion between the runner and the commentators, most frequently describing techniques or using observational humor and banter. Humor and banter is especially used for non-interactive or repetitive sequences that don't require the runner to use much or any skill. Donations from viewers may feature humorous comments that contain inside jokes among the speedrunning community, as well as more personal acknowledgments concerning the charity donated to. Because of the live broadcast and wider audience, runners and commentators are encouraged to refrain from using strong profanity and offensive behavior.

When donating, donors have the option to put their money towards a particular incentive. These incentives can be in the form of bonus speedruns, showcases of additional tricks or glitches, or an in-game decision such as naming the player character.

History 

Writer and speedrunner Eric Koziel identifies two important precursors to Games Done Quick: the "Desert Bus for Hope" donation drive organized by LoadingReadyRun in November 2007, and a series of charity speedrun marathons held by TheSpeedGamers starting in March 2008.

Users of the site Speed Demos Archive decided to hold a charity marathon in January 2010, during MAGFest 8. It was themed around 8-bit and 16-bit video games and thus dubbed "Classic Games Done Quick" (after the 1990s speedrunning project Quake Done Quick). Internet connectivity problems at the MAGFest hotel forced SDA administrator Mike Uyama to relocate the event to his mother's residence, but it raised over $10,000 for CARE.

Following that initial success, the first Awesome Games Done Quick marathon was held in January 2011, expanding from two days to five days, incorporating newer games such as Halo and Portal, and raising more than $50,000 for the Prevent Cancer Foundation. The first Summer Games Done Quick was held in August 2011, raising $20,000 for the Organization for Autism Research. Since then, both Awesome Games Done Quick and Summer Games Done Quick have recurred annually, raising larger amounts each year.

A one-off additional marathon was held in March 2011 to support victims of the earthquake and tsunami in Japan; Japan Relief Done Quick raised over $25,000. In addition, a one-off promotional event was held on March 20, 2015, to celebrate the 10th anniversary of the God of War franchise. Over the course of five hours, God of War Done Quick ended up raising $3,500 for The AbleGamers Foundation.

Due to the COVID-19 pandemic, all Games Done Quick events—excluding SGDQ 2022—have been virtual events since SGDQ 2020. In-person attendance briefly returned for SGDQ 2022 under strict social distancing, mandatory masking, and vaccine mandate protocol (with all attendees required to have a full series of COVID-19 vaccine and booster dose), while also continuing to intersperse remote runners alongside those present on-stage. In September 2022, GDQ pulled AGDQ 2023 from Florida due to the state's stances on LGBT rights and COVID-19 (the state strictly prohibits vaccine mandates), and announced that it would therefore revert to being a virtual event due to the costs of cancelling their venue contract. Ahead of the event, Uyama announced that he would stepping down from his role in GDQ after 13 years "to take care of my health and kind of focus on different activities".

In February 2023, the game Hogwarts Legacy became the latest of several examples to be banned by GDQ from all future events for having "content, views, or an origin that we have deemed unsuitable for our stream." The ban also applied to  all other Harry Potter-licensed games, though these would be "subject to further review". While no explanation was given, some publications saw this as a response to Harry Potter series' creator J. K. Rowling's controversial views on transgender people.

List of marathons

Awesome Games Done Quick (AGDQ) 
Originally called Classic Games Done Quick (CGDQ), this annual marathon is held every year in early January raising money for the Prevent Cancer Foundation.

Summer Games Done Quick (SGDQ) 
Introduced in 2011 as a companion to AGDQ, this marathon is usually held in late June or early July and raises money for Doctors Without Borders. Since 2015, the event has typically been held in the Minneapolis–Saint Paul region.

Special marathons 
Games Done Quick Express (GDQx) is an annual three-day marathon held at TwitchCon since 2018. There was no Games Done Quick Express event held in 2020 or 2021 due to the cancellation of TwitchCon those years.

Frame Fatales is a week-long marathon featuring only women and non-binary runners. It started in 2019 as a four-day event and started fundraising for the Malala Fund in 2020.

Controversies 
As GDQ events have become more popular, there have been several controversies, with players and commentators being banned, and with the stream chat having to be muted. GDQ has noted they advise attendees to avoid "topics of conversation that are polarizing or controversial in nature" as well as avoiding harassing other players. Some attendees have been banned for making inappropriate comments, although there are criticisms that some of the bans may be without merit.

In 2017, a commentator, PvtCinnamonBun, on a speedrun for the game Ape Escape 2 for AGDQ 2017, was banned from all future events for supposedly wearing a "Make America Great Again" (MAGA) hat on stream shortly after Donald Trump's controversial election to the United States presidency. However, according to Kotaku, PvtCinnamonBun's ban was revoked since it was not actually a MAGA hat, but GDQ officials banned him again for supposedly unplugging a power strip cable. Another speedrunner, Cyberdemon531, was also banned from the event for owning the MAGA hat in the first place.

In 2018, speedrunner "BubblesDelFuego", who speedruns Dark Souls and Fallout 4, was banned from all future GDQ events after sharing edible medicinal cannabis with a friend, which resulted in that friend having a panic attack and being transported to the hospital by paramedics. Bubbles consumed edible cannabis for chronic pain resulting from complications with Hodgkin lymphoma. Bubbles told Kotaku that although he understood why he was banned, he believed that the GDQ "enforcement" staff abused their power and were misinformed about tetrahydrocannabinol (THC), the active chemical in cannabis.

At SGDQ 2019, speedrunner "ConnorAce" used a spliced run to illegitimately claim the world record on Clustertruck for the "NoAbility%" category, depriving the legitimate record holder from being invited. The run was treated with suspicion due to it not being submitted officially to speedrun.com, with the video being unlisted on YouTube prior to ConnorAce's acceptance into SGDQ. In October 2019, ConnorAce's run was exposed by the YouTuber documentarian Apollo Legend.

At AGDQ 2020, various runners, including "Luzbelheim" (or "Luz"), were scheduled to run a relay playthrough of Final Fantasy VIII. Hours before, however, Luz's Twitter bio went viral for his comment that he hates "feminazism", identifies as "deminonbinary", and he uses the pronouns "luz/luz". Other online news publications negatively reacted to GDQ organizers allowing Luz to play in the relay playthrough. Luz was given a ban without details about its length.

During Summer GDQ 2022, Russian speedrunner "Mekarazium" admitted that he faked a run of Metal Gear Rising: Revengeance Blade Wolf DLC. The game was played remotely, unlike most of the other games at the event, and the DLC was a donation incentive. While the main game was played live by Mekarazium, the DLC was pre-recorded. Viewers quickly noted discrepancies with the run. Mekarazium admitted to faking the run and was banned from future GDQ events.

Notes

References

External links 

Charity events in the United States
Speedrunning
Video game events
2010 establishments in the United States
Recurring events established in 2010